Tadeusz Dołęga-Mostowicz (10 August 1898 – 20 September 1939) was a Polish writer, journalist and author of over a dozen popular novels. One of his best known works, which in Poland became a byword for fortuitous careerism, was The Career of Nicodemus Dyzma (1932). Literary historians believe the book inspired the 1971 novel Being There by Jerzy Kosiński, with some charging Kosiński with plagiarism, which sparked considerable controversy in the West.

Life and work
Tadeusz Mostowicz, the son of a wealthy Polish lawyer in the age of partitions, was born on 10 August 1898 at his family's village of Okuniewo near Vitebsk in the Russian Empire (now Belarus). After graduating from gimnazjum (high school) in Vilna (now Vilnius, Lithuania), then also in the Russian Empire, in 1915 Tadeusz embarked upon law studies at the University of Kyiv while the First World War raged on in Central Europe. He befriended numerous fellow members of the Polish diaspora and became involved in a local underground group of the Polska Organizacja Wojskowa (Polish Military Organization, abbreviated "POW" in Polish).

After the Russian Revolution, Okuniewo was seized by Bolshevik Russia, and Mostowicz's family moved back to newly reborn Poland, where they bought a small village. Also in 1918, Tadeusz moved to Warsaw, where he joined the Polish Army. He fought as a volunteer in the Polish-Soviet War of 1919–21, and was demobilized in 1922.

While working at printing houses, Mostowicz sent short stories to newspapers and was finally discovered to be a talented reporter. From 1925 he was on the staff of the daily Rzeczpospolita (The Republic), one of the most influential newspapers in Poland. About that time he adopted the pen name "Dołęga", after his mother's Dołęga coat of arms.  While a journalist, he began publishing short stories and pamphlets, many of which achieved considerable popularity.

In 1928 he quit his journalistic job and devoted himself full-time to writing fiction. The following year he finished his first novel, and in 1930 published it as Ostatnia brygada (The Last Brigade). However, it was not until 1932 that he became famous as the author of Kariera Nikodema Dyzmy (The Career of Nicodemus Dyzma), the most popular of his books. Initially serialized in newspapers, the novel proved a major success.  Thereafter  Mostowicz wrote an average of 2 novels a year.  His monthly income is estimated to have exceeded 15,000 zlotys, some 2,800 1939 US dollars.

During the Invasion of Poland in 1939, Dołęga-Mostowicz was mobilized and served as commanding officer of an outpost defending a bridge over the Cheremosh River at the town of Kuty in southeastern Poland.  On 22 September 1939, he was killed in a skirmish with the advancing Soviet Red Army. Resulting from this, most of his books were banned in Stalinist Poland after the communist takeover.

In 1978 his remains were exhumed and on 24 November interred at Warsaw's Powązki Cemetery.

Film adaptations
Most of his novels have been filmed:

See also
 Politics in fiction
List of Poles

References

  Kariera Nikodema Dyzmy online

1898 births
1939 deaths
People from Hlybokaye District
People from Disnensky Uyezd
Polish male novelists
20th-century Polish novelists
20th-century Polish male writers
Polish Army officers
Polish people of the Polish–Soviet War
Polish military personnel killed in World War II
Burials at Powązki Cemetery
20th-century Polish journalists